Pannychia moseleyi  is a sea cucumber in the family Laetmogonidae. It was first described by Johan Hjalmar Théel in 1882. It can be up to 200 mm long and 40 mm wide. It occurs in the benthic zone at depths greater than 400 m.

Bioluminescence 
Pannychia moseleyi produces bioluminescence in the form of waves of blue and green light travelling along its body.

References 

Laetmogonidae
Taxa named by Johan Hjalmar Théel